Luisa Seghezzi (born 6 December 1965) is an Italian former cyclist. She competed in the women's road race event at the 1984 Summer Olympics.

Major results
Sources:
1984
 9th Olympic Road race
1987
 8th UCI World Championship Road race
1988
 10th Overall Tour de France féminin
1990
 3rd  UCI World Championship Road race

References

External links
 

1965 births
Living people
Italian female cyclists
Olympic cyclists of Italy
Cyclists at the 1984 Summer Olympics
Cyclists from Bergamo